Burrows is an unincorporated community in Liberty Township, Carroll County, Indiana, United States. It is part of the Lafayette, Indiana Metropolitan Statistical Area.

History
The Burrows post office was originally called Cornucopia. The post office opened at Burrows (Cornucopia) in 1853.

Geography
Indiana State Road 25 and the Norfolk Southern Railway both pass northeast through town.

Demographics

References

Unincorporated communities in Carroll County, Indiana
Unincorporated communities in Indiana
Lafayette metropolitan area, Indiana